Joseph Thomas "Bones" Spudic (December 24, 1912 – June 21, 1999) was an American professional basketball player. He played in the National Basketball League for the Hammond Ciesar All-Americans in two games during the 1939–40 season. Swihart averaged 1.0 points per game.

References

1912 births
1999 deaths
American men's basketball players
American military personnel of World War II
Basketball players from Indiana
Forwards (basketball)
Hammond Ciesar All-Americans players
Sportspeople from East Chicago, Indiana